Sambucus canadensis, the American black elderberry, Canada elderberry, or common elderberry, is a species of elderberry native to a large area of North America east of the Rocky Mountains, south to Bolivia. It grows in a variety of conditions including both wet and dry soils, primarily in sunny locations.

Description
In summer, it bears large ( diameter) corymbs of white flowers above the foliage, the individual flowers  diameter, with five petals.

The fruit (known as an elderberry) is a dark purple to black berry 3–5 mm diameter, produced in drooping clusters in the fall.

Taxonomy
It is closely related to the European Sambucus nigra. Some authors treat it as conspecific, under the name Sambucus nigra subsp. canadensis.

Toxicity
Inedible parts of the plant, such as the leaves, stems, roots, seeds and unripe fruits, can be toxic at lethal doses due to the presence of cyanogenic glycosides and alkaloids. Traditional methods of consuming elderberry includes jams, jellies, and syrups, all of which cook down the fruit and strain out the seeds.

Unpublished research may show that S. canadensis (American elderberry) has lower cyanide levels than apple juice, and that its fruit does not contain enough beta-glucosidase (which convert glucosides into cyanide) to create cyanide within that biochemical pathway.  For comparisons, assuming S. nigra has levels of no more than 25 micrograms of cyanogenic glycosides/milligram of berry weight, assuming all of the glycosides were converted to cyanide, and assuming a toxicity of 50 mg for a 50 kg vertebrate, one would need to eat 2 kilograms (~4.4 pounds) of berries in one sitting to reach the lower limits of lethal toxicity (1 mg cyanide/kg of weight).  For the upper limits (3 mg/kg), one would need to eat 6 kg or ~13 pounds.

Uses
The flower, known as elderflower, is edible, as are the ripe berries. A drink can be made from soaking the flower heads in water for eight hours. Other uses for the fruit include wine, jelly and dye. The leaves and inner bark can be used as an insecticide and a dye. The leaves are also traditionally used topically in herbalism.

The genus name comes from the Greek word sambuce, an ancient wind instrument, in reference to the removal of pith from the twigs of this and other species to make whistles.

The boiled inner bark of the elderberry was used by the Iroquois of North America as a pain-reliever in tooth-aches, being applied to the side of the cheek that was most virulent.

References

canadensis
Flora of North America
Flora of South America
Plants described in 1753
Taxa named by Carl Linnaeus
Berries
Bird food plants
Edible plants
Medicinal plants of North America